Lakeland Junior/Senior High School (Formerly Lakeland High School) is a public high school located in Lagrange, Indiana. Lakeland Jr/Sr High School (LHS) is the only high school part of Lakeland School Corporation and is a member of the New Tech Network. LHS provides its students with a laptop to use for school work- part of a 1:1 technology initiative- and focuses on education that emphasizes project-based learning (PBL). LHS students are given the opportunity to complete a variety of dual credit and Advanced Placement classes in a variety of subjects in addition to completing their regular requirements for a high school diploma. Current partners for dual credit and AP are IPFW, IUPUI, Ivy Tech Community College, Trine University, and the University of Saint Francis (Indiana). As of the 2019–20 school year, the school serves grades 7–12.

Demographics
The demographic breakdown of the 578 students enrolled in 2016-17 was:

By gender
Male - 50.7%
Female - 49.3%

By race
Native American/Alaskan - 0.2%
Asian - 0.9%
Black - 1.6%
Hispanic - 19.2%
White - 75.3%
Multiracial - 2.8%

45.5% of the students were eligible for free or reduced-cost lunch. For 2016–17, Lakeland was a Title I school.

The demographic breakdown of the 855 students enrolled in 2020-21 was:

By gender
Male - 55.7%
Female - 49.3%

By race
American Indian/Alaska Native - 0.5%
Asian - 0.6%
Black - 0.5%
Hispanic - 22.0%
White - 72.8%
Multiracial - 3.6%

By grade
7th grade - 155
8th grade - 130
9th grade - 152
10th grade - 146
11th grade - 151
12th grade - 119
Ungraded - 2

For 2020-21, Lakeland was a Title I school.

Athletics
The Lakeland Lakers compete in the Northeast Corner Conference.  The school colors are Columbia blue, red and white. The following Indiana High School Athletic Association (IHSAA) sanctioned sports are offered:

Baseball (boys) 
Basketball (girls and boys) 
Cross country (boys and girls)
Football (boys)
Golf (girls and boys) 
Gymnastics (girls) 
Soccer (girls and boys) 
Softball (girls) 
Tennis (girls and boys) 
Track and field (girls and boys) 
Volleyball (girls) 
Wrestling (boys)

Recent Corporation History
In 2019 they announced that they would close two of the elementary schools. The two schools that they would close would be Wollcotmills and Lima Brighton. Starting in the 20-21 school year all students would go to three schools instead of five. The firs school would be renamed the primary it would host grades k-2. The second school would be the intermediate it would host host grades 3-6. The final school was renamed the Jr/Sr high it would host grades 7-12. The other two schools would soon to become preschools and community places.

See also
 List of high schools in Indiana
 Lagrange, indiana

References

External links

Buildings and structures in LaGrange County, Indiana
Public high schools in Indiana
Education in LaGrange County, Indiana